Troy Donahue (born Merle Johnson Jr., January 27, 1936 – September 2, 2001) was an American film and television actor and singer. He was a popular sex symbol in the 1950s and 1960s.

Biography

Early years
Born January 27, 1936, in New York City, Donahue was the son of a retired stage actress and the manager of the motion-picture department of General Motors. Donahue stated in a 1959 interview:
Acting is all I ever wanted. Ever since I can remember, I've studied and read plays. My mother would help me, but my parents didn't want me to become an actor. They preferred something more stable—doctor, lawyer, Indian chief, anything.
"I can remember always being exposed to Broadway and theater people", he added in 1984. "I can remember sitting with Gertrude Lawrence while she read her reviews in The King and I."

Troy and his family grew up on Middle Road, in Bayport. 

To please his parents, Donahue attended a New York military academy, where he met Francis Ford Coppola. He was going to attend West Point, but suffered a knee injury at a track meet. He volunteered for the army, but was rejected.

When Donahue was 18, he moved to New York and got a job as a messenger in a film company founded by his father (who had died when he was 14). He was fired, he says, because he was too young to join the union. He attended Columbia University and studied journalism. He acted in summer stock in Bucks County. He trained briefly with Ezra Stone, and then moved to Hollywood.

Hollywood
One evening, producer William Asher and  director James Sheldon spotted Donahue in a diner in Malibu and arranged for a screen test with Columbia Pictures, but it was unsuccessful.

Some time later, Donahue was in a car accident in which he drove off a road and plunged 40 feet down a canyon.

Actress Fran Bennett introduced him to agent Henry Willson, who represented Rock Hudson. Willson signed him and changed his name to Troy Donahue.

"At first they had Paris, the lover of Helen of Troy, in mind", Donahue says. "But I guess they thought they couldn't name me Paris Donahue because there was already a Paris, France, and Paris, Illinois." He later added "it took me five minutes to get used to [my]" new name.

Universal
Donahue signed with Universal Studios in October 1956. They started him off in small roles in films such as Man Afraid, Man of a Thousand Faces, The Tarnished Angels, Above All Things, and The Monolith Monsters (all 1957).

In 1958, he was also used in Summer Love, and had a slightly bigger part in Live Fast, Die Young. He began appearing on TV in a guest part in Man Without a Gun. This was followed by parts in This Happy Feeling, Wild Heritage, Voice in the Mirror, The Perfect Furlough, and Monster on the Campus (billed fifth). He often had better roles in TV, guest-starring in episodes of The Californians, Rawhide, Wagon Train, and Tales of Wells Fargo and The Virginian.

He later said "In most of those Universal pictures, if you went out for popcorn you missed me."

Donahue achieved good reviews for a brief, but effective part in Imitation of Life (1959), playing a young white man who beats up his new girlfriend after he discovers she is black.

Warner Bros. and A Summer Place
The big break of Donahue's career came when he was cast opposite Sandra Dee in A Summer Place, made by Warner Bros. in 1959. The director was Delmer Daves. Warner signed him to a long-term contract. They put him to work guest-starring in episodes of their Western TV series, such as Colt .45 (1959), Maverick (1959), Sugarfoot (1959), The Alaskans (1960), and Lawman (1960).

A Summer Place was a hit and made Donahue a name, especially among teenaged audiences. In 1960, he was named by The Film Daily as one of the five "finds" of the year. He had a support part in a disaster movie, The Crowded Sky (1960).

He was reportedly going to be cast in Splendor in the Grass, but missed out to Warren Beatty.

Surfside 6
Instead, Warner Bros. put him in a TV series, Surfside 6 (1960–62), one of several spin-offs of 77 Sunset Strip, announced in April 1960.  On Surfside 6, Donahue starred with Van Williams, Lee Patterson, Diane McBain, and Margarita Sierra in the ABC series, set in Miami Beach, Florida. After Surfside 6 was cancelled, Donahue joined the cast of Hawaiian Eye, another spinoff of Sunset Strip, for its last season from 1962 to 1963 in the role of hotel director Philip Barton, joining Robert Conrad and Connie Stevens in the series lead.

Donahue's career got a big break when Joshua Logan dropped out as director of Parrish (1961); Logan was replaced by Delmer Daves, who brought in Donahue as star, and the film was a hit.

Donahue and Daves reunited for another melodrama, Susan Slade (1962). They made a fourth film, Rome Adventure (1962), a romance starring Suzanne Pleshette.

In 1962, he claimed he received 5,000–7,500 fan letters a week. The following year, exhibitors voted him the 20th most popular star in the US. He was also popular in Japan.

"I guess because I was blond, blue-eyed, and tanned, people associated me with all those beach movies that were around then, even though I never did one", he later said. "I was always the goody-goody, the guy who did what he was supposed to."

He did appear in a nearly beach-party film, Palm Springs Weekend (1963), alongside several other Warner Bros. players. As a change of pace, Pleshette and he were cast in a Western A Distant Trumpet (1964), the last film of director Raoul Walsh.

Recording star
Donahue also had a brief tenure as a recording artist at the height of his fame in the early 1960s, releasing a handful of singles for Warner Bros. Records, including "Live Young" and "Somebody Loves Me". However, none of his recordings entered the Billboard Hot 100 list.

Leaving Warner Bros.
In 1965, Donahue was cast as a psychopathic killer opposite Joey Heatherton in My Blood Runs Cold. While Donahue was happy to break type and play a different type of role, it was not well received by the public. His contract with Warner Bros. ended shortly thereafter—although it ran until early 1968, Donahue asked to be released from it in January 1966. Donahue later claimed:
Jack Warner called every studio I used to work for and used his muscle to keep me busted. I was blackballed and everyone in the business knew it. Please print that. I made one film in Europe playing a Victorian astronaut, but no one ever saw it. Then by the time I could get work again, it was too late because my type was already out of fashion.
He later reflected on this period, "They pumped me til the well went dry. My image came out of Warner Bros. and it was one that was on its way out. I think I'm a little deeper than the roles I was given to play." In 1967, he said Parrish had been the most satisfactory of his movies. "I had the best script and the best opportunity as an actor. Not too many of those came my way. But I did get great exposure at Warner [Bros.]. Now I'm free to call my own shots. I've made more money in two years on my own than the whole time I was under contract."

The work was not very distinguished, however: a spy spoof, Come Spy with Me (1967); a British adventure tale, Jules Verne's Rocket to the Moon (1967); and a Western for Albert Zugsmith, The Phantom Gunslinger (shot 1967, released 1970).

In 1967, Donahue walked out of a contract to appear in the play Poor Richard at the Pheasant Run Playhouse. He was sued for $200,000.

Universal
In 1968, Donahue signed a long-term contract with Universal Studios for films and TV. This lasted a year and saw him get four roles: guest shots on Ironside (1968), The Name of the Game (1968), and The Virginian (1969), and an appearance in the TV movie The Lonely Profession (1969).

Decline
Donahue declared bankruptcy in 1968 and eventually lost his home. "I was living like a movie star but wasn't being paid like one", he says. "I lived way over my head and got into great trouble and lost everything. I went from a beautiful home, garden, swimming pool to living in shabby apartments."

Donahue later admitted that he began abusing drugs and alcohol at the peak of his career and increased use after his career began to wane:
I was loaded all the time... I'd wake up about 6:30 in the morning, take three aspirins mixed with codeine, slug down half a pint of vodka and then do four lines of cocaine. That was just so I could get the front door open to peek out and see if I could face the day... I would lie, steal and cheat, all those wonderful things that drunks do. I was crafty. Nobody knew how much I drank then. If a bottle was out on the counter, I'd take a swig when I passed it and quickly put it back.

"I spent a lot of time judging beauty contests and opening banks", Donahue said of this period. He also wrote TV screenplays under a pseudonym.

Donahue was struggling to make his way in a changing Hollywood. As he said later, "If you're the boy next door and you're supposed to be squeaky clean, all you had to do was let your sideburns grow and suddenly you were a hippie." Donahue says when he met casting directors they would ask "Why don't you comb your hair? How come you have grown a moustache? What are you doing with a beard?" He also thinks his career was hurt by the fact he was an anti-Vietnam War Democrat while "everybody assumed I was a Republican".

He wrote screenplays under a pseudonym and performed in The Owl and the Pussycat on stage in stock.

Move to New York
In 1969, Donahue moved from Los Angeles to New York City. He said a few years later:
It took guts to walk out of Hollywood, but it would have been worse to stay. I had a house, seven black Cadillac convertibles, and two wrecked marriages. I already had my head turned; turning back was easy. It doesn't matter if I have a beard or a crewcut. People respond to me because I have a human quality. I know I'll be put down by Hollywood, but I don't speak to anybody out there anyway... I smoke grass and ride cycles, my lifestyle is casual, but I'm not a dope fiend or a hippie freak. I've found strength in Jesus Christ and he's easier to follow than Zen Buddhism. I'm not strung out. I'm a very reasonable, professional actor.
While in New York, Donahue appeared in the daytime CBS drama The Secret Storm for six months. He later called the role "the best part I ever had".

By this time, Donahue's drug addiction and alcoholism had ruined him financially. One summer, he was homeless and lived in Central Park. "There was always somebody who could be amused by Troy Donahue", he says. "I'd meet them anywhere, in a park, street, party, in bed. I lived in a bush in Central Park for one summer. I kept everything I had in a backpack."

He had roles in low-budget films such as Sweet Savior (1971), The Last Stop (1972), and Seizure (1974), Oliver Stone's directorial debut.

In 1974, Francis Ford Coppola cast him in a small part in The Godfather Part II as the fiancé of Connie Corleone. His character was named Merle Johnson, a nod to Donahue's real name. Donahue was paid $10,000 for the role for one week's work.

Return to Hollywood
Donahue moved back to Los Angeles, where he married for a fourth time. He appeared in Cockfighter (1974) for director Monte Hellman, and made South Seas in the Philippines.

He acted in occasional television guest spots (Ellery Queen, The Hardy Boys, CHiPs) and appeared in whiskey commercials for the Japanese television market. Donahue said in 1978:
After eight years at Warners, I did a few independent pictures that never went any place. I travelled, played stickball, had a few marriages and many affairs. I just totally enjoyed myself and did the things I didn't get to do when I was a kid. Now I've decided I wanna go back to work again and I've been encouraged by a lot of people who feel that I have the talent and everything that goes with it.
There was talk of a TV movie, Return to a Summer Place, but it was never made.

After his fourth marriage ended in 1981, Donahue decided to seek help for his drinking and drug use. In May 1982, he joined Alcoholics Anonymous, which he credited for helping him achieve and maintain sobriety. "I look upon my sobriety as a miracle", he says. "I simply do it one day at a time. The obsession to not drink has become as big as the obsession to drink. I was very fortunate."

Later years
Donahue continued to act in films throughout the 1980s and into the late 1990s. He appeared in the feature film Grandview, U.S.A. which was shot in Pontiac, Illinois. "Crowds of teenaged girls would swarm around C. Thomas Howell, and teenaged boys around Jamie Lee Curtis, but the major celebrity was Donahue", recalls director Randal Kleiser. "These women who had grown up with him as their heartthrob followed him everywhere."

However, he never obtained the recognition that he had in the earlier years of his career. Donahue's final film role was in the 2000 comedy film The Boys Behind the Desk, directed by Sally Kirkland.

Personal life
Donahue was married four times and had one child, Sean. His first marriage was to actress Suzanne Pleshette, with whom he had twice co-starred in films. They wed on January 5, 1964, in Beverly Hills, and divorced nine months later.

On October 21, 1966, Donahue married actress Valerie Allen in Dublin  They separated in April 1967, and she filed for divorce in April 1968, charging him with cruelty, divorcing in November 1968.

Donahue's third marriage was to executive secretary Alma Sharpe. They married on November 15, 1969, in Roanoke, Virginia. "I couldn't take care of myself, and I knew this friend would take me under her wing", he says. They divorced in 1972.
Donahue's fourth and final marriage was to land developer Vicki Taylor. They were married in 1979 and divorced in 1981. In his final years, Donahue was in a long-term relationship with mezzo-soprano Zheng Cao, to whom he was engaged and with whom he lived in Santa Monica, California.
Donahue had a son, Sean, by a woman with whom he had a brief relationship in 1969. He only found out about the son in the early 1980s when he encountered the woman again. As he recalled in 1984:
She walked over and introduced herself and I remembered that we had been together four or five times in L.A. in 1969. Nothing serious. Just fun and games. She said, "I'm glad I saw you. I've always wanted to tell you about something. Look over there, Troy." I looked and across the room I saw a 13-year-old spitting image of what I looked like when I was young. "This is your son, Sean", she said. "He's known all his life that you are his father."... I see him every couple of weeks now.
In 1958, Donahue was jailed for 15 days for speeding. In 1961, his one-time fiancée Lili Kardell sued him for damages, claiming he had hit her without provocation.

Death
On August 30, 2001, Donahue suffered a heart attack and was admitted to Saint John's Health Center in Santa Monica. He died three days later on September 2 at the age of 65.

Filmography
{| class="wikitable sortable"
|+ Film
|-
! Year
! Title
! Role
! class="unsortable" | Notes
|-
| 1957
| Man Afraid 
| Reporter 
| Uncredited
|-
| 1957
| Man of a Thousand Faces
| Assistant Director in Bullpen
| Uncredited
|-
| 1957
| The Tarnished Angels
| Frank Burnham 
|
|-
| 1957
| Flood Tide 
| Teenager at Beach 
| Uncredited
|-
| 1957
| The Monolith Monsters
| Hank Jackson 
| Uncredited
|-
| 1957
| Summer Love
| Sax Lewis
| 
|-
| 1958
| Live Fast, Die Young
| Artie Sanders / Artie Smith 
|
|-
| 1958
| This Happy Feeling
| Tony Manza 
| 
|-
| 1958
| Wild Heritage
| Jesse Bascomb 
|
|-
| 1958
| Voice in the Mirror
| Paul Cunningham 
| 
|-
| 1958
| The Perfect Furlough
| Sgt. Nickles 
| 
|-
| 1958
| Monster on the Campus
| Jimmy Flanders 
|
|-
| 1959
| Imitation of Life
| Frankie  
| 
|-
| 1959
| A Summer Place
| Johnny Hunter 
| 
|-
| 1960
| The Crowded Sky
| McVey 
| 
|-
| 1961
| Parrish
| Parrish McLean 
| 
|-
| 1961
| Susan Slade
| Hoyt Brecker 
|
|-
| 1962
| Rome Adventure
| Don Porter
| 
|-
| 1963
| Palm Springs Weekend
| Jim Munroe 
|
|-
| 1964
| A Distant Trumpet
| 2nd Lt. Matthew 'Matt' Hazard 
| 
|-
| 1965
| My Blood Runs Cold
| Ben Gunther 
| 
|-
| 1967
| Come Spy with Me
| Pete Barker 
| 
|-
| 1967
| Jules Verne's Rocket to the Moon
| Gaylord 
| Alternative title: Those Fantastic Flying Fools
|-
| 1970
| The Phantom Gunslinger 
| Bill
|
|-
| 1971
| Sweet Savior
| Moon 
| Alternative title: Frenetic Party
|-
| 1972
| The Last Stop
| Sheriff 
|
|-
| 1974
| Seizure
| Mark Frost 
| 
|-
| 1974
| Cockfighter
| Randall Mansfield 
| 
|-
| 1974
| South Seas
| Steve 
|
|-
| 1974
| The Godfather: Part II
| Merle Johnson
|
|-
| 1977
| The Legend of Frank Woods
| Sheriff John Baxom 
| 
|-
| 1977
| Ultraje
| Daniel
| 
|-
| 1983
| [[Tin Man (1983 film)|Tin Man]]| Lester
|
|-
| 1984
| Katy the Caterpillar| Walla 
| Voice, English-dubbed version
|-
| 1984
| Grandview, U.S.A.| Donny Vinton 
|
|-
| 1986
| Low Blow| John Templeton
| Alternative title: The Last Fight to Win: The Bloody End|-
| 1987
| Fight to Win| Rosenberg
| Alternative titles: Dangerous PassagesEyes of the Dragon|-
| 1987
| Cyclone 
| Bob Jenkins 
| 
|-
| 1987
| Hyôryu kyôshitsu| Taggart
| English title: The Drifting Classroom|-
| 1987
| Hollywood Cop| Lt. Maxwell 
|
|-
| 1987
| Deadly Prey| Don Michaelson 
| 
|-
| 1988
| Hawkeye| Mayor
| Alternative title: Karate Cops|-
| 1988
| Hard Rock Nightmare| Uncle Gary 
| 
|-
| 1989
| Assault of the Party Nerds| Sid Witherspoon 
| Direct-to-video release
|-
| 1989
| American Rampage| Police Psychiatrist 
|
|-
| 1989
| Dr. Alien| Dr. Ackerman 
|
|-
| 1989
| Terminal Force| Slim
|
|-
| 1989
| Sounds of Silence| Larry Haughton 
|
|-
| 1989
| Bad Blood| Jack Barnes 
|
|-
| 1989
| Hot Times at Montclair High| Mr. Nichols 
|
|-
| 1989
| Blood Nasty| Barry Hefna 
| 
|-
| 1989
| The Chilling| Dr. Miller 
|
|-
| 1989
| Deadly Spygames| Python 
|
|-
| 1989
| The Platinum Triangle| Harold Farber 
| 
|-
| 1990
| Click: The Calendar Girl Killer| Alan
|
|-
| 1990
| Cry-Baby| Hatchet's Father 
|
|-
| 1990
| Omega Cop| Slim
|
|-
| 1990
| Nudity Required| Jack
| Alternative title: Young Starlet|-
| 1990
| Sexpot| Phillip
|
|-
| 1991
| Shock 'Em Dead| Record Exec
|
|-
| 1991
| Deadly Diamonds| Matt Plimpton 
| Direct-to-video release
|-
| 1992
| Double Trouble| Leonard
|
|-
| 1992
| The Pamela Principle| Troy
|
|-
| 1993
| Showdown| Police Captain
|
|-
| 1998
| Merchants of Venus| FBI Agent
| Alternative title: A Dirty Little Business|-
| 2000
| The Boys Behind the Desk| unknown role
| 
|}

Box office ranking
 1960: voted 5th most likely star of Tomorrow
 1961: 24th most popular star in the US
 1963: 20th most popular star in the US

Theatre credits
 Stalag 17 (1953)
 The Owl and the Pussycat (1966)
 Poor Richard (1967)

In popular culture
 Troy Donahue was one of the inspirations for The Simpsons character Troy McClure, along with Doug McClure, and a measure of the character's voice actor Phil Hartman.
 Donahue is mentioned in the song "Look at Me, I'm Sandra Dee", from the 1971 musical Grease, reflecting his status as a teen idol at the time in which the action is set. The line, which is performed by Stockard Channing in the 1978 film version, is as follows: "As for you, Troy Donahue, I know what you want to do."
 Donahue is also mentioned in the song "Mother" in the musical A Chorus Line'', when the character Bobby sings, "If Troy Donahue could be a movie star, then I could be a movie star."

References

External links
 
 
 
 Troy Donahue at Brian's Drive-In Theater
 Troy Donahue at Encore4.net

1936 births
2001 deaths
20th-century American male actors
21st-century American male actors
American male film actors
American male pop singers
American male television actors
Columbia University Graduate School of Journalism alumni
Male actors from New York City
Singers from New York City
Warner Bros. contract players
20th-century American singers
20th-century American male singers
New Star of the Year (Actor) Golden Globe winners